Aderkomyces thailandicus is a species of lichen in the family Gomphillaceae. Found in Thailand, it was described as new to science in 2011.

References

Lichens described in 2011
Lichen species
Lichens of Asia
Ostropales
Taxa named by Robert Lücking